is a Japanese screenwriter and film director.

Career
Born in Namegata District, Ibaraki, Yanagimachi attended the Faculty of Law at Waseda University but began studying filmmaking. Working as a freelance assistant director after graduating, he started his own production company in 1974 and produced the documentary film God Speed You! Black Emperor (1976) about bōsōzoku. He made his fiction film debut in 1979 with Jūkyūsai no Chizu. That and the later Himatsuri were based on novels by Kenji Nakagami. His 1982 work Saraba Itoshiki Daichi showed in the Competition at the Berlin Film Festival. His films have often focused on youth (Who's Camus Anyway?), on ethnic minorities in Japan (Ai ni Tsuite, Tokyo), as well as on Asia (Shadow of China and the documentary Tabisuru Pao-jiang-hu).

Yanagimachi was awarded the Geijutsu Senshō Prize in 1985 by the Agency for Cultural Affairs.

Filmography as director
 God Speed You! Black Emperor (1976; documentary)
 Jūkyūsai no Chizu (A 19-Year-Old's Map) (1979)
 Saraba Itoshiki Daichi (Farewell to the Land) (1982)
 Himatsuri (Fire Festival) (1985)
 Shadow of China (1990)
 Ai ni Tsuite, Tokyo (About Love, Tokyo) (1992) 
 Tabisuru Pao-jiang-hu (Travelling Medicine Peddlers) (1995; documentary)
 Who's Camus Anyway? (2005)

Awards

References

External links
 
 JMDB entry

1945 births
Japanese film directors
Living people
People from Ibaraki Prefecture
Japanese documentary filmmakers
Japanese screenwriters
Writers from Ibaraki Prefecture